Peeni Ereatara Gladwyn Henare is a New Zealand Labour Party politician who has been a member of the New Zealand parliament for the Tāmaki Makaurau Māori electorate since the 2014 general election.

Family
His father was Erima Henare, who was the head of the Māori Language Commission.

Political career

In Opposition, 2014–2017
Peeni Henare won the Tāmaki Makaurau electorate ahead of Rangi McLean of the Māori Party in 2014. In 2016, a member's bill submitted by Henare which aimed to ban the import of goods produced by slave labour was drawn from the ballot. The bill had been first introduced by Maryan Street and defeated at its first reading in 2009. It was again defeated at its first reading in 2016 due to opposition from the National Party and Act New Zealand.

In Government, 2017–present
During the 2017 New Zealand general election, Henare was re-elected in the Tāmaki Makaurau electorate, winning 9,396 votes. Henare was elected as a Minister outside Cabinet by the Labour Party caucus following Labour's formation of a coalition government with New Zealand First and the Greens in October 2017. He assumed the portfolio of Minister for Whānau Ora, which falls under the purview of Te Puni Kōkiri (the Ministry for Māori Development).

Following a cabinet reshuffle in late June 2019, Henare was appointed as Minister of Civil Defence.

During the 2020 general election, Henare retained Tāmaki Makaurau, defeating the Māori Party candidate and co-leader John Tamihere and Green co-leader Marama Davidson. When the official results were released, Henare had a majority of 956, but after the Māori Party requested a recount in Tāmaki Makaurau, Henare's majority fell slightly to 927. In November 2020, Henare was announced as Minister of Defence and Minister for Whānau Ora. He also assumed the health, housing and tourism associate porfolios with responsibility for Māori health and housing.

In May 2022 he indicated to Labour Party President Claire Szabó that he would possibly be unwilling to recontest Tāmaki Makaurau at the 2023 New Zealand general election, preferring instead to contest the election as a list-only candidate.

In November 2022, Henare in his capacity as Defence Minister visited Polish Minister of National Defence Mariusz Błaszczak. He subsequently visited Ukrainian Defence Minister Oleksii Reznikov and paid tribute to the fallen at The Wall of Remembrance of the Fallen for Ukraine in Kyiv. Henare's visit to Ukraine marked the first visit by a New Zealand cabinet minister since the 2022 Russian invasion of Ukraine.

During a cabinet shuffle that occurred on 31 January 2023, Henare was succeeded as Defence Minister by Andrew Little. Henare became the Minister for the Accident Compensation Corporation (ACC), Minister of Tourism, and Minister for the Environment while retaining the Associate Minister of Health portfolio with responsibility for Māori.

References

|-

|-

|-

|-

|-

|-

|-

Living people
New Zealand Labour Party MPs
Members of the Cabinet of New Zealand
Members of the New Zealand House of Representatives
New Zealand MPs for Māori electorates
21st-century New Zealand politicians
Candidates in the 2017 New Zealand general election
Year of birth missing (living people)
Candidates in the 2020 New Zealand general election
New Zealand defence ministers